The 2004 Dubai Duty Free Men's and Women's Tennis Championships was a tennis tournament played on outdoor hard courts at the Aviation Club Tennis Centre in Dubai in the United Arab Emirates that was part of the International Series Gold of the 2004 ATP Tour and of Tier II of the 2004 WTA Tour. The men's tournament was held from March 1 through March 7, 2004 while the women's tournament was held from February 23 through February 28, 2004.

Finals

Men's singles

 Roger Federer defeated  Feliciano López 4–6, 6–1, 6–2
 It was Federer's 2nd title of the year and the 19th of his career.

Women's singles

 Justine Henin-Hardenne defeated  Svetlana Kuznetsova 7–6(7–3), 6–3
 It was Henin-Hardenne's 3rd title of the year and the 19th of her career.

Men's doubles

 Mahesh Bhupathi /  Fabrice Santoro defeated  Jonas Björkman /  Leander Paes 6–2, 4–6, 6–4
 It was Bhupathi's 2nd title of the year and the 33rd of his career. It was Santoro's 3rd title of the year and the 18th of his career.

Women's doubles

 Janette Husárová /  Conchita Martínez defeated  Svetlana Kuznetsova /  Elena Likhovtseva 6–0, 1–6, 6–3
 It was Husárová's 1st title of the year and the 16th of her career. It was Martínez's only title of the year and the 43rd of her career.

External links
 Official website
 ATP Tournament Profile
 WTA Tournament Profile

 
2004
Dubai Tennis Championships
Dubai Tennis Championships